The Pulse of Life is a 1917 American silent drama film directed by Rex Ingram and starring Wedgwood Nowell, Gypsy Hart and Dorothy Barrett.

Cast
 Wedgwood Nowell as Guido Serrani 
 Gypsy Hart as Lisetta Maseto 
 Dorothy Barrett as Buckety Sue 
 Molly Malone as Molly Capels 
 Nicholas Dunaew as Domenic 
 Millard K. Wilson as Stanford Graham 
 Albert MacQuarrie as 'Dago' Joe 
 J. Edwin Brown as Luigi Maseto 
 Seymour Hastings as Hasting Capels 
 William J. Dwyer as Fish Merchant

References

Bibliography
 Leonhard Gmür. Rex Ingram: Hollywood's Rebel of the Silver Screen. 2013.

External links
 

1917 films
1917 drama films
1910s English-language films
American silent feature films
Silent American drama films
Films directed by Rex Ingram
American black-and-white films
Universal Pictures films
1910s American films